The 1946 UK & Ireland Greyhound Racing Year was the 21st year of greyhound racing in the United Kingdom and Ireland.

Roll of honour

Summary
The greyhound racing industry experienced an extraordinary year in 1946, with all previous records in terms of attendances and totalisator turnover being broken. The year would be the pinnacle in the history of the sport and would never be matched again. Attendances were estimated to be around 75 million based on an annual totalisator turnover of £196,431,430. The figure equates to £8 billion today (2018), using a historic inflation calculator, which indicates the significance of the industry at the time. Trading on greyhound racing shares at the stock exchange were centre stage business.  

The leading greyhound company, the Greyhound Racing Association (GRA) recorded record attendances and profits at all of their tracks. The largest tote turnover was at White City and reached £17,576,190.

Competitions
Mondays News won the 1946 English Greyhound Derby, run under floodlights for the first time. In the Derby Consolation Stakes, Quare Times won by four lengths from Bah's Choice in 28.82 seconds to improve on his own world record.

The Scottish Greyhound Derby and Welsh Greyhound Derby clashed, in the former Lattin Pearl defeated Grand Prix champion Magic Bohemian and in the latter, Negros Lad overcame a field including defending champion Shaggy Lass and 1945 English Greyhound Derby finalist Duffys Arrival. The time of 29.54 broke the track record.

A week after the Scurry Gold Cup (won by Mischievous Manhattan) the Wembley Summer Cup paired the two fastest greyhounds in training Bah's Choice and Quare Times. Bah's Choice won the event from Shannon Shore, Magic Bohemian, Shaggy Lass and Negro's Lad in addition to Quare Times. The race attracted significant national attention and Major Percy Brown (Racing manager at White City) contacted the owners of the two greyhounds to arrange a return match between them, at White City, on August Bank Holiday Monday. Quare Times was handled by the 'Wizard of Burhill', Sidney Orton, while Bah's Choice was trained by Bob Burls at Wembley. Quare Times, was first from the traps and made no mistakes setting a new world record of 30.38 seconds for the 550 yards course. 

In the Invitation Stakes run at Coventry on 9 August, Bah's Choice gained revenge beating Quare Times by five lengths, in a new track record with a time of 29.45 seconds. Sadly entered for the Birmingham Cup at Perry Barr in September, Bahs Choice broke a hock in his first round heat and was retired to stud.  Shannon Shore gained some compensation for his Derby defeat after winning the Laurels, the January 1943 whelp would retire to stud after an unsuccessful attempt to retain his Golden Crest crown which went to Rimmells Black. Stan Biss won the Oaks for the fifth time with Dumbles Maid, a brindle and white bitch that had turned in the traps and refused to chase just a few weeks previous.

A strong entry for the St Leger saw Bohernagraga Boy win by just a short head from recent Oaks champion Dumbles Maid, Monday's News struggled with the longer distance and could only finish a disappointing fifth. History was made during the All England Cup, held at Brough Park when four of the entries were all four nations Derby winners. The English Greyhound Derby winner Mondays News, the Irish Greyhound Derby champion Lilac Lady, Welsh Greyhound Derby winner Negro's Lad and Scottish Greyhound Derby champion Lattin Pearl all competed. The hope that all four would progress to the final failed to materialise but two of them Monday's News and Lattin Pearl did make the final and duly finished first and second.

Tracks
Just two known tracks were opened during 1946. A proposed track application for Darnley between Barrhead and Thornliebank was rejected by Glasgow magistrates, on the grounds that it was too near houses and would cause traffic congestion. A company called the Darnley Greyhound Racing Track Ltd had already been formed in readiness.

The Glasgow City assessor attempted to increase the valuations of the five greyhound stadiums in Glasgow, which was opposed by the tracks because they did not want to have to pay increased tax. Carntyne, owned by the Scottish Greyhound Racing Company was valued at £4,500 by the assessor but £3,700 by the track, which was followed by White City, White City Glasgow Ltd £6,700 (£4,000), Albion, Glasgow-Albion Racing Ltd £12,000 (£1,250), Firhill, Partick Thistle FC & Firhill Racing Company Ltd £3,000 (£2,500) and finally Shawfield, Shawfield Greyhound Racing Company Ltd £4,000 (£600).

Tracks opened

News
1946 Irish Greyhound Derby winner Steve was withdrawn from the Aldridges sales despite bids in excess of £1,000. Owner Mrs. R.H.Dent refused to sell to connections who intended to flap (race on independent tracks) with him. Steve would have to continue his career in Ireland because English Racing Managers refused to allow him to race. This was because of a previous disqualification for fighting at Wembley during a trial. Two other greyhounds failed to sell at Aldridges; Motts Regret went unsold despite a bid of 1,250 guineas and Col Skookum was taken off the bench despite a 1,450 guineas bid. 

Walthamstow Stadium owner William Chandler died and left equal shares to his children. Charles Chandler became managing director and Percy was responsible for the catering and restaurants. Victor Sr. and Jack were already bookmakers and Ronnie trained greyhounds in Ireland.

In July the first case of a greyhound traveling by air took place when Warrington greyhound Clady Border, trained by Ken Newham went from Manchester Airport to Belfast, to take part in an event at Celtic Park in which he won. During the same year Fernane Sweeper was the first greyhound to fly the Atlantic. Wandsworth transported their racing greyhounds from the track kennels to the race track using a Scammell Mechanical Horse that pulled a trailer of 56 greyhounds in individual kennels to the race track. 

Motts Regret, a brindle whelped in April 1944 by Trev's Dispatch out of Friar Tuck, had been bred and reared in the Cumberland Fells by Mr H.G. Nunn. During the year he won a number of open races and was entered for the English Greyhound Derby at White City without success. Later that year he went down with distemper and pneumonia at the GRA Hook Estate and Kennels in Northaw and it was thought he would die, but after a long convalescence would make it back to the track in 1947. Lemon Flash (the 1946 McAlinden Cup winner) and Tim O'Linn died of distemper in Birmingham private kennels, the latter had recently cost his new owner £1,400.

Frederick Johnson a breeder from Tarporley in Cheshire, was refused a private trainers licence by the National Greyhound Racing Club, with his wife Mary they farmed sixty acres and bred the 'Rushton' greyhounds prefix. Johnson contemplated giving up greyhound racing after the decision but luckily decided against it. 

Ballynennan Moon and Ballyhennessy Seal both on stud duties demanded £100 for a mating fee at the Burhill Kennels.

A greyhound called Long Rally who set a track record in his first race at Darnall is subject to a record bid of 2,100 guineas but his owner refuses the offer because he had set a reserve of 2,250 guineas.

Ireland
Kilkenny Greyhound Stadium opened on 5 June, the first winner was a greyhound called Rebel Gunner. Dunmore Stadium, in Belfast which had suffered serious fire and bomb damage during the war underwent significant renovation. Two new stands were built, one acted as a reserved area and the other was unreserved. The 1946 Irish Greyhound Derby was won by an English connection for the first time when Steve, owned by Mrs. R.H.Dent took the honours. Mrs. Dent had owned Wattle Bark, winner of the 1937 English Greyhound Derby.

Principal UK races

+Track Record

Totalisator Returns

The totalisator returns declared to the licensing authorities for the year 1946 are listed below. Tracks that did not have a totalisator in operation are not listed. Attendances peaked during the year, at around 70 million and totalisator turnover surpassed £196 million reaching £196,431,430.

Summary

References 

Greyhound racing in the United Kingdom
Greyhound racing in the Republic of Ireland
UK and Ireland Greyhound Racing Year
UK and Ireland Greyhound Racing Year
UK and Ireland Greyhound Racing Year
UK and Ireland Greyhound Racing Year